Ashaga-Stal is a rural locality (a selo) and the administrative centre of Ashaga-Stalsky Selsoviet, Suleyman-Stalsky District, Republic of Dagestan, Russia. The population was 2,849 as of 2010. There are 72 streets.

Geography 
Orta-Stal is the nearest rural locality.

Famous residents 
 Suleyman Stalsky (poet)
 Sayad Stalskaya (poet)

References 

Rural localities in Suleyman-Stalsky District